3-Bromobenzaldehyde is an organic compound with the formula .  It is a colorless viscous liquid.  It is one of three isomers of bromobenzaldehyde.

3-Bromobenzaldehyde can be prepared from 3-nitrobenzaldehyde.

References 

Bromoarenes
Benzaldehydes